Boss Hoss Cycles is a US motorcycle manufacturer founded by Monte Warne in 1990 and based in Dyersburg, Tennessee.

Overview 
The company manufactures extraordinarily large displacement motorcycles and motorized tricycles with  Chevrolet V8 engines, and semi-automatic transmissions. By the mid-1990s, Boss Hoss was selling 300 vehicles per year. , Boss Hoss has sold over 4,000 vehicles.

Boss Hoss motorcycles' and tricycles' mass has a vibration damping effect, which combined with having eight engine cylinders and the very tall gears of the semi-automatic transmission results in what has been described as "vibration-free acceleration".

See also
Millyard Viper V10
Motorcycling

References

External links

Official site
Some of the baddest Boss Hoss Motorcycles from Motorcycle.com

Motorcycle manufacturers of the United States
Companies based in Tennessee
Dyer County, Tennessee
Vehicle manufacturing companies established in 1990
Eight-cylinder motorcycles